Elizma Nortje (born 1 February 1966) is a Namibian tennis coach and former professional player. She is the most successful Namibian woman to have played professionally and was the first to be ranked on the WTA Tour.

Born in Windhoek in 1966, Nortje represented South Africa as a junior and early in her professional career, before Namibian independence. She played collegiate tennis for United States International University in San Diego, competing in the NCAA Division I Championships. In the early 1990s she made appearances in the doubles qualifying draws at Wimbledon and won two ITF doubles tournaments.

Nortje served as president of the Namibian Tennis Association from 1996 to 1999 and was Namibia's team captain when the country made its Fed Cup debut in 2004. A certified ITF Level 3 coach, she is now the head tennis professional at the Van Der Meer Tennis Academy in South Carolina.

ITF finals

Singles: 1 (0–1)

Doubles: 11 (2–9)

References

External links
 
 
 

1966 births
Living people
South African female tennis players
Namibian female tennis players
United States International Gulls
Sportspeople from Windhoek
White Namibian people
White South African people
College women's tennis players in the United States